Suryabinayak Municipality is a city in Bagmati Province in Central Nepal. It is the largest city of Bhaktapur district with a population of 137,971 with 23,637 households. It was created in December 2014 through the merger of the Village development committees of Kautunje (the municipality's centre), Sipadol, Nankhel and Chitpol. The municipality's name stems from the local Suryavinayak Temple. In March 2017, under new local level restructuring, Suryabinayak Municipality was expanded to include the neighboring municipality of Anantalingeshwor, adding four more previous VDCs of Sirutar, Gundu, Dadhikot and Balkot. According to the 2011 Nepal census, the predecessors of Suryabinayak Municipality had a population of 78,490.

Transportation
Different Buses from Dhulikhel and Panauti depart and arrive every of 5 min to Kathmandu. As well other different transport is available from Suryabinayak.

References

External links
 Suryabinayak Municipality Official Page

Populated places in Bhaktapur District
Nepal municipalities established in 2014
Cities in Nepal